Blood Relatives is an American documentary television series on Investigation Discovery that debuted on June 7, 2012. Narrated by Brenda Strong, the voice of Desperate Housewives character Mary Alice Young, the series examines murders that were committed within families. Blood Relatives's season five began airing in August 2016.

References

External links

2010s American documentary television series
2012 American television series debuts
English-language television shows
Investigation Discovery original programming
2017 American television series endings